The Iranian Esperanto Association (IREA), founded in 1996, is the national association of the World Esperanto Association  in Iran.

The core of IREA is based on the Iranian Esperantist Youth Organization and current official organ of IREA is the journal Irana Esperantisto.

References

Esperanto organizations
Organizations established in 1996
Esperanto in Iran
Organisations based in Iran
National Esperanto organizations